Podocarpus spinulosus, the dwarf plum pine or spiny-leaf podocarp, is a species of podocarp native to the warm-temperate coastal regions of New South Wales and southern Queensland. It is generally an understorey shrub, rarely growing more than 2 m tall.

It was first described by James Edward Smith in 1817 as Taxus spinulosa. It was reclassified 'as Podocarpus spinulosus in 1825.

References

Flora of New South Wales
Flora of Queensland
Pinales of Australia
spinulosus
Least concern flora of Australia
Least concern biota of Queensland